Suleiman al-Halabi, also spelled Soleyman El-Halaby (1777–1800), was a Kurdish man who assassinated French general Jean-Baptiste Kléber, leader of the French occupation forces in Egypt. He was tortured by burning his hand to the bone before being executed by anal impalement. The descriptive Al Halabi means "from Aleppo".

Early life
Suleiman al-Halabi was of Kurdish origin, born in 1777 in Aleppo, His father, Mohammad Amin, was a merchant of butter and olive oil. Al-Halabi's father sent him to Cairo, Egypt in 1797 to study Islamic sciences at Al-Azhar University.

Assassination, trial and execution

On June 14, 1800, al-Halabi approached Kléber's home in the guise of a beggar seeking an audience with Kléber.  When he approached him, Kléber extended his hand for al-Halabi to kiss in return for some money. Instead, al-Halabi violently pulled the general toward him and stabbed him four times with a stiletto. He was 23 years old when he assassinated the commander of the French campaign on Egyptian soil. Kléber's chief engineer tried to defend him and was stabbed but not mortally wounded.

Al-Halabi hid in a nearby park where he was found by French soldiers, who searched him and found his stiletto. He was arrested and tortured, his right arm burnt to the bone while he denied any relationship with Sheikh Abdullah al-Sharqawi or the popular resistance movements. He was tried and sentenced to death by anal impalement. He was placed on a blunt stick that slowly pushed at his organs, dragged down by his weight, and remained on it for four hours, reciting Quranic verses.

Aftermath
An Arab nationalist play based on his assassination of General Kléber, "Sulayman Al-Halabi," was written by Egyptian playwright Alfred Farag in 1965.

References

1777 births
1800 deaths
1800 murders in Africa
Syrian assassins
People executed by impalement
Executed assassins
People from Aleppo
18th-century executions by Egypt
Syrian people executed abroad
Al-Azhar University alumni
Syrian torture victims